Coupe de Ville is a 1990 American comedy-drama film directed by Joe Roth. It stars Daniel Stern, Arye Gross, and Patrick Dempsey as three very different brothers asked by their father to drive a 1954 Cadillac convertible from Detroit to Miami.

Plot
Meet the Libner brothers: Marvin, the oldest, is a sergeant in the U.S. Air Force. Buddy, the middle child, is a timid dreamer. Bobby, the youngest, is a handsome rebel in reform school. As kids, they fought a lot and as adults, they barely speak to each other. In the summer of 1963, their tough and eccentric father, Fred, gives them a task: to bring a 1954 Cadillac convertible, bought for their mother, Betty, from Detroit to Miami. As the trip goes on, the three brothers fight and begin to reconnect with each other while trying to keep the Caddy in mint condition.

Cast

Production 
Despite the film's title, the 1954 two-door Cadillac Series 62 convertible in the movie is not an early generation Coupe De Ville; in 1954, the Coupe De Ville was a hardtop coupe in the Cadillac Series 62, originally introduced in 1949. The full De Ville series (all hardtops) was introduced in 1959, while the convertible was not introduced until 1964.

A portion of the film was shot in Cape Coral, FL. When set director Richard Villalobos needed props for the Florida segments, he connected with the CEO of Goodwill Industries of Southwest Florida to acquire props for the film, purchasing $4,000 worth of gently-used items from the local Goodwill store.

Arye Gross, who plays middle brother Buddy, narrated the pilot episode of The Wonder Years, but was replaced by Daniel Stern, who plays oldest brother Marvin, for the remainder of the series and in all subsequent rebroadcasts of the pilot.

Reception

Box office
The film was a box office failure; in its opening weekend (March 9–11, 1990) it only grossed $66,871. In the end, Coupe de Ville only opened in 170 theaters and made $715,983 in the US and Canada. It grossed $6 million worldwide.

Critical response
On Rotten Tomatoes the film has an approval rating of 25% based on reviews from 8 critics.

Roger Ebert of the Chicago Sun-Times gave it 1.5 out of 4 and wrote: "There is something deadening about the kind of formula picture where you know with absolute certainty what is going to happen, and how, and why."
Owen Gleiberman of Entertainment Weekly gave it grade C−.

References

External links
 
 
 
 
 
 

1990 films
1990s coming-of-age comedy-drama films
1990s road comedy-drama films
American coming-of-age comedy-drama films
American road comedy-drama films
Cadillac
1990s English-language films
Films about automobiles
Films about brothers
Films scored by James Newton Howard
Films directed by Joe Roth
Films set in 1963
Morgan Creek Productions films
Universal Pictures films
1990 comedy films
1990 drama films
1990s American films